Flavio Aquilone (born 21 February 1990) is an Italian voice actor.

Biography
Born in Rome to dubbing director Novella Marcucci, Aquilone made his first voice acting debut at the age of four. He carries on with his career as of today and he is the official Italian voice of Zac Efron and Tom Felton. Other actors Aquilone had dubbed includes Rami Malek, Liam Hemsworth, Anton Yelchin, Devon Bostick, Dane DeHaan, Daryl Sabara and many others.

Aquilone's character roles include Draco Malfoy in the Harry Potter franchise, Juni Cortez in the Spy Kids franchise and Chase Matthews in Zoey 101. In his animated roles, he voiced Hiccup in the Italian dub of the How to Train Your Dragon franchise.

Personal life
Aquilone is in a relationship with voice actress Valentina Favazza. On September 19, 2019, they had a son, Enea.

Dubbing roles

Animation
Hiccup in How to Train Your Dragon
Hiccup in How to Train Your Dragon 2
Hiccup in How to Train Your Dragon: The Hidden World
Hiccup in DreamWorks Dragons
George Little in Stuart Little 3: Call of the Wild
Kludd in Legend of the Guardians: The Owls of Ga'Hoole
Scott in Total Drama
Leonard Helperman in Teacher's Pet
Arthur Pendragon in Shrek the Third
Cody Maverick in Surf's Up
Fugo in Sword of the Stranger
Otto Osworth in Time Squad
Nova in Ultimate Spider-Man
Jimmy Neutron in Jimmy Neutron: Boy Genius
Jamie in The Amazing World of Gumball (2nd voice)
Adrien Agreste in Miraculous: Tales of Ladybug & Cat Noir
Brad Buttowski in Kick Buttowski: Suburban Daredevil
Light Yagami in Death Note
Louis in Beastars
Jean Kirschtein in  Attack on Titan
Snap in Oh Yeah! Cartoons
Armand Roulin in Loving Vincent
Shawn Froste in Inazuma Eleven

Live action
Draco Malfoy in Harry Potter and the Philosopher's Stone
Draco Malfoy in Harry Potter and the Chamber of Secrets
Draco Malfoy in Harry Potter and the Prisoner of Azkaban
Draco Malfoy in Harry Potter and the Goblet of Fire
Draco Malfoy in Harry Potter and the Order of the Phoenix
Draco Malfoy in Harry Potter and the Half-Blood Prince
Draco Malfoy in Harry Potter and the Deathly Hallows – Part 1
Draco Malfoy in Harry Potter and the Deathly Hallows – Part 2
Troy Bolton in High School Musical
Troy Bolton in High School Musical 2
Troy Bolton in High School Musical 3: Senior Year
Juni Cortez in Spy Kids
Juni Cortez in Spy Kids 2: The Island of Lost Dreams
Juni Cortez in Spy Kids 3-D: Game Over
Juni Cortez in Spy Kids: All the Time in the World
Rodrick Heffley in Diary of a Wimpy Kid
Rodrick Heffley in Diary of a Wimpy Kid: Rodrick Rules
Rodrick Heffley in Diary of a Wimpy Kid: Dog Days
Gale Hawthorne in The Hunger Games
Gale Hawthorne in The Hunger Games: Catching Fire
Gale Hawthorne in The Hunger Games: Mockingjay – Part 1
Gale Hawthorne in The Hunger Games: Mockingjay – Part 2
Peter Pevensie in The Chronicles of Narnia: The Lion, the Witch and the Wardrobe
Peter Pevensie in The Chronicles of Narnia: Prince Caspian
Peter Pevensie in The Chronicles of Narnia: The Voyage of the Dawn Treader
Patrick McCardle in The Derby Stallion
Teen Mike O'Donnell in 17 Again
Charlie St. Cloud in Charlie St. Cloud
Paul in New Year's Eve
Jason in That Awkward Moment
Cole Carter in We Are Your Friends
Jason Kelly in Dirty Grandpa
Dave Stangle in Mike and Dave Need Wedding Dates
Matt Brody in Baywatch
Phillip Carlyle in The Greatest Showman
Cameron Bale in Summerland
Dodge Landon in Rise of the Planet of the Apes
Patrick in The Apparition
James Ashford in Belle
Lucius Tyco Ennius in Risen
Jackson Michaels in A Time for Dancing
Zack Mazursky in Alpha Dog
Kyle Reese in Terminator Salvation
Porter Black in The Beaver
Charley Brewster in Fright Night
Ian in Only Lovers Left Alive
Milton Schultz in Dying of the Light
Andrew Detmer in Chronicle
Cricket Pate in Lawless
Lockhart in A Cure for Wellness
Lucien Carr in Kill Your Darlings
Chris Morgan in Devil's Knot
Harry Osborn in The Amazing Spider-Man 2
Zach Orfman in Life After Beth
James Dean in Life
Jamal Malik in Slumdog Millionaire
Julio in Machete
Chase Matthews in Zoey 101
Finn Hudson in Glee
Woody Fink in The Suite Life on Deck
Curtis in The Santa Clause 2
Curtis in The Santa Clause 3: The Escape Clause
Ben Geller in Friends
Chris in Everybody Hates Chris
Michael Hobbs in Elf
Andres Calixto in Violetta 
Nat Wolff in "Body Cam"
Dathan in The Rise of Skywalker

Video games
Nova in Disney Infinity 2.0

References

External links

1990 births
Living people
Male actors from Rome
Italian male voice actors
Italian male video game actors
20th-century Italian male actors
21st-century Italian male actors